Berosus amoenus is a species of hydrophilid beetle endemic to the Northern Territory (Australia)  which was first described in 1987 by Chris H.S. Watts.

References

Hydrophilinae
Beetles described in 1987